Alvin Earl "Junior" Moore (born January 25, 1953) is an American former professional baseball player. He was a third baseman and outfielder who appeared in 289 games in the Major Leagues for the Atlanta Braves (1976–1977) and Chicago White Sox (1978–1980).

Career
Moore was drafted by the Braves in the eleventh round (257th overall) of the 1971 Major League Baseball Draft after graduating from John F. Kennedy High School of Richmond, California. He was nearing the end of his sixth season in minor league baseball when he was recalled from the Triple-A Richmond Braves and made his Major League debut on August 2, 1976, starting at third base against the San Diego Padres. Moore then spent the entire  campaign with Atlanta, appearing in an MLB-career-high 112 games (and starting 92 games at third base). But he was released at the end of the season, and signed as a free agent by the White Sox. Moore then split  between the ChiSox and the Triple-A Iowa Oaks before logging another full campaign, in the Majors. Playing mostly as an outfielder, he appeared in 88 games, with 42 starts in the field.

In his 289 big-league games, Moore collected 204 hits in 774 at bats, with 20 doubles and seven triples accompanying his seven home runs. He spent the final five seasons of his professional career in the Mexican League, retiring in 1985.

External links

1953 births
Living people
African-American baseball players
American expatriate baseball players in Mexico
Atlanta Braves players
Baseball players from Texas
Bravos de León players
Broncos de Reynosa players
Chicago White Sox players
Columbus Clippers players
Greenwood Braves players
Iowa Oaks players
Major League Baseball left fielders
Major League Baseball right fielders
Major League Baseball second basemen
Major League Baseball third basemen
People from Waskom, Texas
Richmond Braves players
Savannah Braves players
Tigres del México players
Wytheville Braves players
21st-century African-American people
20th-century African-American sportspeople